Albert Paulig (14 January 1873 – 19 March 1933) was a German film actor who was popular during the silent era. Paulig made his first film in 1914. The following year he appeared in one of Ernst Lubitsch's first directorial attempts, A Trip on the Ice (1915). Paulig was in a number of Harry Piel, thrillers including The Man Without Nerves (1924).

Selected filmography

 The Firm Gets Married (1914)
 The Platonic Marriage (1919)
 The Maharaja's Favourite Wife (1921)
 Love at the Wheel (1921)
 The Adventuress of Monte Carlo (1921)
 The Bull of Olivera (1921)
 Peter Voss, Thief of Millions (1921)
The Lost House (1922)
 The Flight into Marriage (1922)
 Only One Night (1922)
 Miss Rockefeller Is Filming (1922)
 Rivals (1923)
 The Weather Station (1923)
 Man Against Man (1924)
 The Man Without Nerves (1924)
 The Brigantine of New York (1924)
 The Creature (1924)
 Zigano (1925)
 The Dice Game of Life (1925)
 Adventure on the Night Express (1925)
 Love's Finale (1925)
 Swifter Than Death (1925)
 Cab No. 13 (1926)
 The Third Squadron (1926)
 Trude (1926)
 Her Husband's Wife (1926)
 Chaste Susanne (1926)
 The Young Man from the Ragtrade (1926)
 Should We Be Silent? (1926)
 Hunted People (1926)
 The Prince and the Dancer (1926)
 The Bank Crash of Unter den Linden (1926)
 The Girl on a Swing (1926)
The Black Pierrot (1926)
 Women of Passion (1926)
 Her Highness Dances the Waltz (1926)
 People to Each Other (1926)
 The Son of Hannibal (1926)
 The Blue Danube (1926)
 The Glass Boat (1927)
 A Modern Dubarry (1927)
 A Serious Case (1927)
 The Dashing Archduke (1927)
 Klettermaxe (1927)
 The Imaginary Baron (1927)
 Break-in (1927)
 Dancing Vienna (1927)
 Vacation from Marriage (1927)
 Schweik in Civilian Life (1927)
 How Do I Marry the Boss? (1927)
 The Prince of Pappenheim (1927)
 His Late Excellency (1927)
 His Greatest Bluff (1927)
 Heads Up, Charley (1927)
 Because I Love You (1928)
 Panic (1928)
 The Lady in Black (1928)
 Tales from the Vienna Woods (1928)
 Master and Mistress (1928)
 The Blue Mouse (1928)
 Immorality (1928)
 Eve's Daughters (1928)
 Left of the Isar, Right of the Spree (1929)
 Men Without Work (1929)
 Lady in the Spa (1929)
 The Model from Montparnasse (1929)
 My Daughter's Tutor (1929)
 Taxi at Midnight (1929)
 Revolt in the Batchelor's House (1929)
 Come Back, All Is Forgiven (1929)
 From a Bachelor's Diary (1929)
 The Fourth from the Right (1929)
 A Student's Song of Heidelberg (1930)
 Susanne Cleans Up (1930)
 Mischievous Miss (1930)
 Frida's Songs (1930)
 Next, Please! (1930)
 The Caviar Princess (1930)
 The Love Market (1930)
 Peace of Mind (1931)
 Die Bräutigamswitwe (1931)
 The Office Manager (1931)
 A Crafty Youth (1931)
 Headfirst into Happiness (1931)
 Terror of the Garrison (1931)
 The Unfaithful Eckehart (1931)
 Queen of the Night (1931)
 The Prince of Arcadia (1932)
 The Testament of Cornelius Gulden (1932)
 Once There Was a Waltz (1932)
 The Ladies Diplomat (1932)
 At Your Orders, Sergeant (1932)
 Two Good Comrades (1933)

References

Bibliography
 Eyman, Scott. Ernst Lubitsch: Laughter in Paradise. Johns Hopkins University Press, 2000.
 Grange, William. Cultural Chronicle of the Weimar Republic. Scarecrow Press, 2008.

External links

1873 births
1933 deaths
German male silent film actors
German male film actors
People from Stollberg
20th-century German male actors